The Fiend Who Walked the West is a 1958 Western film based on the 1947 film noir Kiss of Death. Almost a horror western, the story involves a psychotic ex-convict terrorising his former cellmate and his family. The director was Gordon Douglas and the film stars Hugh O'Brian, Robert Evans, Dolores Michaels, Linda Cristal, Stephen McNally, and Ron Ely.

Plot

Cast
Hugh O'Brian - Daniel Slade Hardy 
Robert Evans - Felix Griffin 
Dolores Michaels - May 
Linda Cristal - Ellen Hardy 
Stephen McNally - Marshal Frank Emmett 
Edward Andrews - Judge Parker 
Ron Ely - Deputy Jim Dyer

See also
 List of American films of 1958

References

External links
 
 
 
 

1958 films
1958 Western (genre) films
American black-and-white films
American Western (genre) films
Films directed by Gordon Douglas
Films scored by Les Baxter
Remakes of American films
Films with screenplays by Charles Lederer
Films with screenplays by Ben Hecht
1950s English-language films
1950s American films